Lip stain or lip tint, is a cosmetic product used to color the lips, usually in form of a liquid or gel. It generally stays on longer than lipstick by leaving a stain of color on the lips.

However, it can dry the lips and is not recommended for winter.

References

Cosmetics
Lips